Runnymede was built in 1854 at Sunderland, England. In 1856 she made her first voyage from London to Australia, transporting convicts to Western Australia. She was wrecked in 1866.

Career
Runnymede first appeared in Lloyd's Register  (LR) in 1854.

Convict voyage (1856): Runnymede, William Burrows, master, sailed from Plymouth on 15 June 1856 and arrived at Fremantle, Swan River Colony, on 7 September. she was the 17th convict ship to arrive there. She carried 248 male convicts, 30 guards with their 19 wives, 18 sons and 22 daughters. There were no deaths among the convicts on the voyage.

Fate
In 1866, Runnymede was carrying wool and copper ore between Wallaroo, South Australia and Tasmania to Swansea, Wales. She sprang a leak off Cape Leeuwin, continued on towards Mauritius, and eventually sank near Klippen Point off Eastern Cape, South Africa. The entry for her in LR for 1865 carries the annotation "Wrecked".

See also
List of convict ship voyages to Western Australia

Citation and references
Citations

References
 

Convict ships to Western Australia
Ships built on the River Wear
1854 ships
Age of Sail merchant ships of England
Migrant ships to Australia
Maritime incidents in 1866